is a Japanese hairstyle worn by  (apprentice geisha). It was also worn in the latter Edo period (1603–1867) and in the Meiji period (1868–1912) by young married women.  wear it before and during the  ceremony, which marks their graduation out of apprenticeship.

References

Hairstyles
Geisha
Japanese words and phrases